The Aloe-class net laying ships were a class of thirty-two steel-hulled net laying ships built prior to the US entry into World War II. The lead ship, was laid down in October 1940 and launched the following January; the final member, was launched in October 1941. They were assigned tree and plant names in alphabetical order, but eight ships (in order Cottonwood, Dogwood, Fir, Juniper, Maple, Poplar, Sycamore, and Walnut) were renamed prior to launching, producing discontinuities in the name order. These ships were originally classed as YN and numbered 1-32, but were reclassified and renumbered in 1944 as AN-6 through AN-37.

They were powered by a pair of diesel engines which provided electricity for both propulsion and lifting machinery; there were also two auxiliary diesels and an evaporator for fresh water. Between the "horns" was an opening through which nets could be hauled, bridged by a catwalk.

 two 700hp Enterprise diesels, Westinghouse reduction gears driving 2 WH generators, one WH motor
 AN-6 ... AN-17 
 General Motors 6-278, Farrel-Birmingham gears
 AN-22 ... AN-33
 uncertain
 AN-34 ... AN-37

All members of this class survived the war though  was caught in a typhoon in September 1945 and decommissioned the following year. Three ships were transferred to the French Navy in 1944 and another three were so transferred in the 1960s; two others went to the Turkish and Ecuadorian navies respectively. Three others were retained for various purposes, while the remainder were put into the reserve fleet shortly after the war.

Class members

References 

 
 

 

Auxiliary gateship classes
 
Auxiliary ship classes of the United States Navy